The International Journal of Environmental Research is a quarterly peer-reviewed scientific journal covering all aspects of environmental studies. It was initially published by the Graduate Faculty of Environment (University of Tehran and the editor-in-chief is Mohammad Hossein Niksokhan. Since 2017, it is published by Springer Science+Business Media.

Abstracting and indexing
The journal is abstracted and indexed in Science Citation Index Expanded, Scopus, Astrophysics Data System, EBSCO databases, INIS Atomindex, and The Zoological Record. According to the Journal Citation Reports, the journal has a 2018 impact factor of 1.488.

References

External links
 

English-language journals
Hybrid open access journals
Publications established in 2008
Environmental science journals
Springer Science+Business Media academic journals